Heaven and Pancake (Swedish: Himmel och pannkaka) is a 1959 Swedish comedy film directed by Hasse Ekman and starring Sickan Carlsson, Ekman, Gunnar Björnstrand and Lena Granhagen. It was shot at the Råsunda Studios in Stockholm. The film's sets were designed by the art director P.A. Lundgren. It is the sequel to Seventh Heaven.

Plot summary 
We follow the now happily married couple Lovisa Sundelius and Villy Lorens. Lovisa is a doctor, and Villy is a popular radio host. But now he will instead lead an entertainment program with quizzes on TV, called "Land in sight"

Cast
Sickan Carlsson as Lovisa Sundelius, doctor 
Hasse Ekman as Villy Lorens, TV-show host of the program "Land in sight", Lovisas husband
Gunnar Björnstrand as Ernst C:son Kruuse
Lena Granhagen as Susanna "Suss" Wikander
Sigge Fürst as Frans Björkeby
Stig Järrel as Sture "Ture" Turesson
Sif Ruud as Franceska Larsson 
Hugo Björne as Manfred Fredriksson 
Hjördis Petterson as Mrs Jägerström, journalist
Ulf Johanson as Alvar Sund
Bellan Roos as Inez, Lovisas and Villys maid
Sune Mangs as Torbjörn Lindelöf, photographer
Gösta Prüzelius as Captain on the bananaboat
 Hanny Schedin as	Mrs. Fredriksson 
 Sven-Axel Carlsson as 	Photographer

References

Bibliography 
 Iverson, Gunnar, Soderbergh Widding, Astrid & Soila, Tytti. Nordic National Cinemas. Routledge, 2005.
 Qvist, Per Olov & von Bagh, Peter. Guide to the Cinema of Sweden and Finland. Greenwood Publishing Group, 2000.

External links

1959 films
Swedish comedy films
1959 comedy films
1950s Swedish-language films
Films directed by Hasse Ekman
Swedish sequel films
1950s Swedish films